The fifth season of The Real Housewives of Miami, an American reality television series, premiered on Peacock on December 8, 2022. The season was primarily filmed in Miami, Florida. Its executive producers are Matt Anderson, Nate Green, Cooper Green and Andy Cohen.

The season focuses on the lives of Guerdy Abraira, Alexia Nepola, Lisa Hochstein, Julia Lemigova, Nicole Martin and Larsa Pippen. Adriana De Moura, Marysol Patton and Kiki Barth are also featured in a recurring capacity.

Cast
For the fifth season, all cast members from the conclusion of the fourth season returned, making it the first time in the show's history the cast was unchanged between seasons. In addition, former housewife Lea Black made a guest appearance during the season.

The primary storyline this season involves the shocking divorce of the Hochsteins.

 During their appearance at the reunion, Patton and Barth are seated on the end of the left couch: Patton next to Nepola, and Barth next to Patton.
 De Moura is seated between Lemigova and Abraira on the right couch.

Episodes

References

External links
 

 

The Real Housewives of Miami
2022 American television seasons
2023 American television seasons